Game of the Year (abbreviated GotY) is a title awarded by various magazines, websites, and shows to a deserving game. Many publications award a single "Game of the Year" to a single title that they feel represents the pinnacle of gaming achievement that year.

Organizations 

Organizations and publications who award board Game of the Year awards include:
Årets spel (Sweden)
As d'Or / Golden Ace
BoardGameGeek
Deutscher Spiele Preis
Games (magazine)
 Gry-Planszowe.pl / Gra Roku (Poland)
Le Diamant d'Or
Mensa
Origins Award
Premio JdA (Spain)
Spiel des Jahres
Kennerspiel des Jahres
Kinderspiel des Jahres
Spiel Portugal (Portugal)

Awards

American Tabletop Awards 
These are winners of the American Tabletop Awards, a US-based board game award selected by a committee of board game media creators for games released in the previous calendar year.

Early Gamers

These are winners in the Early Gamers category, a category targeted at people new to board games.

Casual Games

These are winners in the Casual Games category, a category intended for gamers of all experience levels.

Strategy Games

These are winners in the Strategy Games category, a category for games that have additional "complexity, planning requirements, and duration" compared to Casual Games.

Complex Games

These are winners in the Complex Games category, a category intended for "longer-form games that typically appeal to more experienced players".

As d'Or / Golden Ace 

These are winners of As d'Or Award, for the best board games of the year submitted at the Cannes International Game Festival

To be continued

Board Game Quest Awards 
These are winners of the Board Game Quest Game of the Year Award. This award is presented to the best board game of the year from the Board Game Quest editorial team, a United States-based board game media outlet.

Deutscher Spiele Preis 
The Deutscher Spiele Preis (German for German Game Prize) is an important award for boardgames. It was started in 1990 by the German magazine "Die Pöppel-Revue", which collects votes from the industry's stores, magazines, professionals and game clubs. The results are announced every October at the Spiel game fair in Essen, Germany. The Essen Feather is awarded at the same ceremony.

Diamond Climber Awards 

These are winners of The Diamond Climber Awards, for the best board games of the year submitted by Meeple Mountain, a United States-based board game media outlet.

Dice Tower Annual Awards 
The Dice Tower (a website, podcast and video network founded by Tom Vasel) has been announcing awards since 2007.

ENnie Awards

The annual ENnie Awards (previously known as the Gen Con EN World RPG Awards) are annual, fan-based awards for role-playing game products and publishers hosted at Gen Con in Indianapolis, Indiana. The name of the award is derived from the EN World web site that hosted the awards from their inception in 2001 until 2018, and retains the name, although is no longer part of EN World. The ENnies were created by Russ Morrissey and Eric Noah and were run and owned by Morrissey until 2018.

Jogo do Ano 
These are winners of the Jogo do Ano, for the best board games of the year submitted to Spiel Portugal.

Games magazine 

The winners of the Games (magazine) Game of the Year are chosen by Games editors:

Golden Geek Award 

The BoardGameGeek Golden Geek Award was originally presented at the BGG.CON event in November, but is currently announced annually in March. The winners of the Golden Geek are selected by the nomination and voting of the user community of BoardGameGeek.com website.

Gra Roku 
 is a  Polish award (the name of the award literary means Game of the Year in Polish) awarded since 2004 by the  Gry-Planszowe.pl portal.

Le Diamant d'Or 
Each year a list of around fifty “expert” management games known as eurogames, chosen and tested by a large number of pre-selectors, brings out 8 games among which the Golden Diamond jury establishes a ranking and devotes the prize to the best game of the year category expert to their favorite.

Mensa Select 

These are winners of Mensa Select Award, for the five best board games of the year submitted to Mensa Mind Games

Origin Awards 

The Origins Awards are American awards for outstanding work in the game industry. They are presented by the Academy of Adventure Gaming Arts and Design at the Origins Game Fair on an annual basis for the previous year, so (for example) the 1979 awards were given at the 1980 Origins. The categories for the Origins award can vary from year to year, and there is not a "Game of the Year" per se.

The Origins Award is commonly referred to as a Calliope, as the statuette is in the likeness of the muse of the same name. Academy members frequently shorten this name to "Callie."

Premio JdA 
Game of the year in Spain, PRemio al Juego de mesa del año (Premio JdA), by an independent (of the game industry) jury.

Spiel des Jahres 
These are winners of Spiel des Jahres, the German board game award.

Kennerspiel des Jahres 
These are winners of Kennerspiel des Jahres, an expansion of the German Spiel des Jahres board game award starting in 2011. It translates to "connoisseur/expert game of the year" and is meant for more experienced gamers.

Kinderspiel des Jahres 
The Kinderspiel des Jahres is awarded every year to the best children's game by a jury of German game critics. This award is to children's games what the Spiel des Jahres is to family games.

2001 was the first year that the Kinderspiel des Jahres was officially awarded. Prior to that year, it was the Sonderpreis "Kinderspiel" (Special Prize for Best Children's Game). Since the intent behind both awards is the same, it is customary to refer to the 1989–2000 Sonderpreis winners as having won the Kinderspiel des Jahres.

See also 

 Board game
 Lists of awards
 List of game awards
 Board game awards

External links
  pdf of awards available from the As d'Or Award page

References 

Board games
 
Board game award winners
Game of the Year awards (board games)